Shi Chunlai (born 1931) is a retired Chinese Ambassador.
He was Deputy Division Chief of the Department of Asia and Africa in the Ministry of Foreign Affairs of the People's Republic of China.
He was First Secretary and Counselor of the Embassy of R. P. China in Dar es Salaam (Tanzania).
He was Counselor of the Chinese Embassy in Harare (Zimbabwe).
He was Deputy Chief of the Political Department of the Ministry of Foreign Affairs of the People's Republic of China.
He was Director General for Africa of the Ministry of Foreign Affairs of the People's Republic of China.
From May 1987 to July 1990 he was Ambassador of the People's Republic of China in Mexico City and until  with accreditation in Belize City.
From September 1990 to November 1993 he was Ambassador of the Republic of China Ambassador in Canberra (Australia) and concurrent accredited in Palikir (Federated States of Micronesia).

References

1931 births
Living people
Ambassadors of China to Mexico
Ambassadors of China to Australia